Kim Yong-dae (born 12 December 1937) is a North Korean politician. He is the chairman of the National Reconciliation Council. He was the leader of the Korean Social Democratic Party from 1998 to 2019.

Career
Kim Yong-dae was born on 12 December 1937 in South Hamgyong Province. He is a graduate of Kim Il-sung University, where he completed a three-year course.

Kim became the Vice Chairman of the Central Committee of the Korean Social Democratic Party in September 1989. He became its Chairman in August 1998. Kim was succeeded by Pak Yong-il in 2019.

Kim was first elected a member of the Supreme People's Assembly (SPA) in the 1990 North Korean parliamentary election. As the parliament began its session, Kim was chosen as the Vice Chairman of its Foreign Affairs committee and a member of the Credentials Committee. Next year, he became the President of the Parliamentary North Korea–Indonesia Friendship Group, Vice Chairman of the Parliamentary North Korea–Iran Friendship Group, and Vice President of the North Korea–Japan Friendship Association. Kim is the Chairman of the National Reconciliation Council.

Kim renewed his SPA seat in 1998 (496th Electoral District) and in 2003 (86th Electoral District). In 2009, he was elected again, this time from the 97th Electoral District.

Kim became a Vice President of the SPA Presidium since 1998. Kim's constituency since the 2019 North Korean parliamentary election is the 118th Electoral District (Jangsang). He was replaced in the Presidium by the new party chairman Pak Yong-il on 29 August 2019.

Fyodor Tertitskiy of NK News characterizes Kim as "just another North Korean bureaucrat" and of less interest than Ryu Mi-yong, the head of the other minor party, Chondoist Chongu Party. Kim was placed second to last on the funeral committee of Kim Jong-il, ahead of only Ryu, testifying to the low-ranking position of heads of minor parties in the North Korean hierarchy.

In August 2004, he met with Ted Turner, the founder of CNN, although the meeting was strictly supervised. In 2012, Kim Yong-dae met with the South Korean Unified Progressive Party representatives and signed a joint-statement condemning Japan's activities in the Liancourt Rocks dispute.

He received the Order of Kim Jong-il in February 2012.

References

External links
 Statement at ITU World Summit on the Information Society 2003

1937 births
Korean Social Democratic Party politicians
Leaders of political parties in North Korea
Members of the Supreme People's Assembly
Living people
Recipients of the Order of Kim Jong-il